Tesco Corporation was an oilfield services company that provided top drive rental services on a day-rate basis for land and oil platforms as well as casing running. It was headquartered in Spring Branch, Houston. In December 2017, the company was acquired by Nabors Industries.

History
The company traces its routes to a company founded in 1986 by Robert Tessari.

On December 1, 1993, Tesco Corporation was formed through the amalgamation of Shelter Oil and Gas Ltd., Coexco Petroleum Inc., Forewest Industries Ltd. and Tesco Corporation. The company also became a public company.

In 1994, Tesco's portable land top drive won a Special Meritorious Award for Engineering at the Offshore Technology Conference show. The team responsible for the research and development of the portable top drive included Robert Tessari, Lindsay J. Hood and Per Angman.

In 1995, the company opened a sales office in Beijing.

In 2002, the company acquired Bo Gray Casing Co. and A&M Tubular Maintenance for $10.5 million.

In 2006, the company moved its headquarters from Calgary to Houston, while continuing to manufacture in Calgary.

In 2011, the company acquired Premiere Casing Services - Egypt S.A.E.

In 2012, Tesco sold its CASING DRILLING™ division to Schlumberger for $45 million.

In 2013, the company acquired automated catwalk technology from Custom Pipe Handlers Canada.

In 2014, the company acquired Tech Field Services.

Glenn A. Ballard Jr. of global law firm Bracewell & Giuliani was rebuked for lying to the court.

In December 2014, Fernando Assing was appointed President and CEO of the company.

In December 2017, the company was acquired by Nabors Industries.

References

2017 mergers and acquisitions
Companies formerly listed on the Nasdaq
Defunct companies based in Texas
Defunct energy companies of the United States
Energy companies disestablished in 2017